The Parliament of Toulouse was one of the parlements of the Kingdom of France, established in the city of Toulouse. It was modelled on the Parliament of Paris. It was first created in 1420, but definitely established by edicts in 1437 and 1443 by Charles VII as an appellate court of justice on civil, criminal and ecclesiastic affairs for the Languedoc region, including Quercy, the County of Foix and Armagnac.  It was the first provincial parlement, intended to administer the Occitan-speaking south of France, and it gained in prestige both by its distance from Paris and from the differences between southern France's legal system (based on Roman law) and northern France's.

After the Parliament of Paris, the Parliament of Toulouse had the largest jurisdiction in France.  Its purview extended from the Rhône to the Atlantic Ocean and from the Pyrénées to the Massif Central, but the creation of the Parliament of Bordeaux in 1462 removed from its jurisdiction Guyenne, Gascony, Landes, Agenais, Béarn and Périgord.

On 4 June 1444, the new parlement of Toulouse moved into a chamber of Toulouse's château narbonnais; its official opening occurred on 11 November of that year.

The Parliament was charged with operating Toulouse's inquisition, burning at least eighteen Protestants alive in the mid-16th century. It was a center of Catholic resistance to the Reformation in the run-up to the 1562 Toulouse Riots and, following its victory on that occasion, completely dominated the town's capitouls.

In 1590, during the French Wars of Religion, Henry IV created the rival Parliament of Carcassonne, attended by parliamentarians faithful to the king.

The most famous trial of the Parliament of Toulouse was the Calas affair. On 9 March 1762, Jean Calas was condemned to death by the Parlement.

With the French Revolution, the Parliament of Toulouse, as too the municipal Capitouls of Toulouse, was suppressed.

See also
 Capitouls and Capitole of Toulouse
 1562 Riots of Toulouse

References

Local government of the Ancien Régime
Tou